Lorenz Horr (born 27 September 1942) is a German former professional footballer who played as a forward. He played in the Bundesliga with Hertha BSC and also played for SV Alsenborn, Wormatia Worms and Waldhof Mannheim. His DM 336,000 transfer from SV Alsenborn to Hertha BSC was the then record transfer fee in German football.

References

Living people
1942 births
German footballers
West German footballers
Sportspeople from Ludwigshafen
Footballers from Rhineland-Palatinate
Association football forwards
SV Alsenborn players
Hertha BSC players
Wormatia Worms players
SV Waldhof Mannheim players
Bundesliga players
2. Bundesliga players